Septemchiton is an extinct genus of polyplacophoran molluscs. Septemchiton became extinct during the Ordovician period.

References 

Prehistoric chiton genera